MS  Regatta was built for Renaissance Cruises as an , she is owned and operated by Oceania Cruises where she is part of their . She was built in 1998 by the Chantiers de l'Atlantique shipyard in St. Nazaire, France, for Renaissance Cruises as R Two. Between 2002 and 2003 she sailed as Insignia before receiving her current name.

Concept and construction

Renaissance Cruises had begun operations in 1989, with a series of eight small luxury cruise ships constructed during the course of the next three years. In the mid-90s the company placed an order for eight identical  vessels with Chantiers de l'Atlantique shipyard in France. The first ship in the series, was delivered in June 1998, followed by R Two in November of the same year.

Design

Exterior design

R Two was built to a somewhat boxy, functional exterior appearance with a large square funnel. In Renaissance Cruises service her hull was painted dark blue, but in Oceania service this was changed to white with a thin blue stripe separating the hull from the superstructure.

Interior design

The interiors of Regatta are decorated in art deco style similar to the ocean liners of the 1920s and 1930s with polished dark wood and warm colours, described by Douglas Ward, author of the Complete Guide to Cruising and Cruise Ships, as being "stunning and elegant". The ship retains most of her interior decorations from her days with Renaissance Cruises, although the lido area on deck 9 was entirely refurbished before she entered service for Oceania Cruises, while smaller changes were carried out in the cabins and restaurants.

Decks
Regatta has ten decks.

Service history

Following her delivery to Renaissance Cruises in November 1998, R Two was placed on cruise traffic in the Mediterranean. Renaissance Cruises went bankrupt on September 25, 2001, following September 11, 2001 terrorist attacks, and, on October 7, 2001, the R Two was arrested in Gibraltar and subsequently laid up. Six of her sisters were also laid up in Gibraltar, with only  and  absent as they were in the Pacific Ocean at the time of the collapse of Renaissance. In December 2001, R Two and the other former Renaissance ships laid up in Gibraltar were sold to Cruiseinvest, and subsequently moved to Marseille, France, for further layup.

In October 2002, R Two was renamed Insignia, given a $10 million refit and chartered to Oceania Cruises, a new company founded by Frank Del Rio (the former vice president of Renaissance Cruises) and Joe Watters (the former CEO of Crystal Cruises). Between April 19 and June 14, 2003, Insignia was chartered to the French travel agency TMR, who marketed the ship under the name Vaisseau Renaissance (her registered name remained unchanged). On June 15, 2003, the ship returned to Oceania Cruises service, but was renamed Regatta, as the name Insignia had been passed to her sister R One that had also been chartered by Oceania.

Regatta was scheduled to undergo a significant renovation in September 2019 as a part of the company's $100 million OceaniaNEXT program.

References

External links
Official website
Photos and Video of Regatta Cruise ship in Yalta, Ukraine

Cruise ships
Ships built in France
1998 ships